Śródmieście  (meaning city centre) is a district of Rybnik, Silesian Voivodeship, southern Poland. In the late 2013 it had about 7,700 inhabitants.

The quarter encompasses the traditional area of Rybnik, old city, with market square, town hall, Basilica of St. Anthony, Our Lady of Sorrows church, Lutheran church, former Piast castle, theatre.

References

Districts of Rybnik